Promenesta haplodoxa is a moth in the family Depressariidae. It was described by Edward Meyrick in 1925. It is found in Brazil (Amazonas).

The wingspan is about 12 mm. The forewings are light brownish ochreous and the hindwings are rather dark grey.

References

Moths described in 1925
Promenesta
Taxa named by Edward Meyrick